Midway Beach is an unincorporated community in Muscatine County, Iowa, United States.

References

Unincorporated communities in Muscatine County, Iowa
Unincorporated communities in Iowa